Tookie may refer to:

Stanley Tookie Williams, American gangster
Tookie Gilbert, American baseball player
Steve Peregrin Took, English musician/songwriter and prominent member of the UK underground, frequently known socially as Tookie
Bartholomew Tookie, MP and mayor
Tookie De La Crème, a fictional character in the book Modelland by Tyra Banks

See also
Tookey, a surname